Tears on the Dancefloor is the fifth studio album by British group Steps. It was released on 21 April 2017, by Absolute and Fascination Records. The album is the group's first album in five years since Light Up the World, and their first proper album since Buzz in 2000. Following two years of planning, recording began in October 2016. The Alias was enlisted to serve as the executive producer for Tears on the Dancefloor and various songwriters submitted songs for the group to record, including Steve Mac, Ina Wroldsen, TMS and Fiona Bevan. It also features a cover version of "Story of a Heart" by Björn Ulvaeus and Benny Andersson of ABBA, a cover of "I Will Love Again" by Lara Fabian as well as a cover of "No More Tears on the Dancefloor" by Anders|Fahrenkrog, from which the album's title is derived.

The album was re-released on 27 October 2017 as Tears on the Dancefloor: Crying at the Disco with five new songs, three of which have accompanying remixes.

Background and release
In 2011, Steps reunited for a four-part documentary series, which aired on Sky Living. Documenting their highly publicised and acrimonious split on Boxing Day in 2001, it revealed what each member had been doing for the previous ten years, as well as reflecting on their time in the group and the truth, causes and effects of their disbandment. It further showed how they could repair their professional, and personal, relationships as a five-piece for the release of their second greatest hits album, The Ultimate Collection (2011), and discussions of officially reforming. The positive response to the album led to the announcement of a reunion arena tour, The Ultimate Tour, in April 2012, and their fourth studio/first Christmas album, Light Up the World, later that year. On 28 November 2016, it was revealed that Steps would be performing at G-A-Y on New Year's Eve to celebrate twenty years since their debut.

On 6 March 2017, Steps confirmed that their fifth studio album, Tears on the Dancefloor, would be released on 21 April in the United Kingdom and be preceded by the lead single, "Scared of the Dark", on 10 March; they also announced the Party on the Dancefloor Tour, which will take place in November and December 2017. In an interview for the Official Charts Company in March 2017, band member Faye Tozer confirmed The Alias as the producer for Tears on the Dancefloor, while Lisa Scott-Lee revealed that planning the album had taken two years in an interview for Popjustice. It is their first album to be composed of mostly original material in seventeen years; Light Up the World was composed of both cover and original songs, and was their first studio album in twelve years.

Recording for the album began in October 2016; Tozer revealed that the first two songs they recorded were omitted from the final track listing due to not sounding "Steps-enough". Scott-Lee revealed that the group had recorded two albums' worth of material during the production of Tears on the Dancefloor, but said that no formal discussions have taken place as to whether or not a sixth studio album will follow in 2018 despite reaffirming her personal desire to do so. Three editions of Tears on the Dancefloor were made available to purchase on their website: a digital version available for download, a limited edition signed CD and a limited edition neon-blue vinyl. The album artwork was inspired by the album cover of their debut album, Step One (1998).

Composition

Music and lyrics
In an interview with Popjustice, Scott-Lee stated that the group strived to create an uplifting, positive pop album and to provide a form of escapism for listeners: "We're not here to get into the politics of the world but what we can offer is escapism and a bit of positivity in people's lives." She continued to elucidate that Tears on the Dancefloor sounds like where they should be twenty years on from their debut, saying "Everyone's dealing with lots of different things but music's universal, and it takes you to another place and time, and this album — I feel — is where Steps should be twenty years on." Songwriters for the album include Steve Mac, Ina Wroldsen, TMS, Carl Ryden, Fiona Bevan, Kevin Verchel and Metrophonic. The group took some inspiration from their back catalogue for the album, with Tozer saying that its sound is reminiscent of their single "Deeper Shade of Blue" (2000) but has more elements of dance music. They also revealed that the album consists of up-tempo songs with a couple of mid-tempo tracks, but no ballads, citing fans preferring their upbeat songs as their reason for deciding not to record any.

Songs
The lead single from the album, "Scared of the Dark", has been described by Popjustice as a "robust blast of pop melodrama", which they thought sounded as though it was lifted from their first greatest hits album, Gold: Greatest Hits (2001). Tozer revealed that a track called "Neon Blue" had been written by Ryden and Bevan, who have written songs for David Guetta and The Saturdays, respectively. She continued to describe the track as "nostalgic" and a "real homecoming type of song". Steps have also recorded a cover version of "Story of a Heart" originally performed by Benny Anderssons Band, and written and composed by Benny Andersson and Björn Ulvaeus of ABBA. Scott-Lee stated that they have often been compared to ABBA and that Anderson and Ulvaeus had given it to them to record and that it serves as a "perfect" bridge to fill the gap between where they were as a group and where they are taking their music forward.

Singles
"Scared of the Dark" premiered on The Ken Bruce Show on BBC Radio 2 on 9 March 2017, and was released on iTunes, Spotify and Apple Music the following day. During a Facebook Live interview with HuffPost UK Entertainment, Ian "H" Watkins announced that "Story of a Heart" would be the album's second single.
"Neon Blue" was released as the third single on 4 August 2017.

Track listing
Credits adapted from the liner notes of Tears on the Dancefloor.

Notes
"You Make Me Whole" is a cover of the song originally performed by Aneta Sablik.
"Story of a Heart" is a cover of the song originally performed by Benny Andersson's solo band.
"No More Tears on the Dancefloor" is a cover of the Anders|Fahrenkrog song.
"I Will Love Again" is a cover of the song originally performed by Lara Fabian.

Charts and certifications

Weekly charts

Year-end charts

Certifications

Crying at the Disco reissue

Tears on the Dancefloor: Crying at the Disco is the reissue of British group Steps fifth studio album Tears on the Dancefloor (2017),  with several new recordings. On 18 September 2017, Steps announced that the album would be reissued on 27 October with five new songs, including a Christmas track, as well as previously unreleased remixes of "Happy", "Glitter & Gold" and "I Will Love Again", and titled Tears on the Dancefloor: Crying at the Disco.

Track listing

Notes
"Dancing with a Broken Heart" is a cover of the song originally performed by Delta Goodrem.
"You Make Me Whole" is a cover of the song originally performed by Zoe Zana  and later by Aneta Sablik & Anna Naklab.
"Story of a Heart" is a cover of the song originally performed by Benny Andersson's solo band.
"No More Tears on the Dancefloor" is a cover of the Anders|Fahrenkrog song.
"I Will Love Again" is a cover of the song originally performed by Lara Fabian.
"Tears on the Dancefloor" is a medley of the 7th Heaven Remixes of "Scared of the Dark", "Story of a Heart", "Neon Blue" and "Dancing with a Broken Heart".

Charts

Release history

See also
List of UK Album Downloads Chart number ones of the 2010s

References

External links
 

Steps (group) albums
2017 albums
Pop albums by British artists